Brandon Vanlalremdika (born 28 January 1994) is an Indian professional footballer who plays as a midfielder or winger for RoundGlass Punjab in the I-League.

Career
Born in Mizoram, Vanlalremdika started his career with Aizawl. He was one of the goalscorers in the I-League 2nd Division match that saw Aizawl promoted to the I-League when they beat Chanmari 4–2.

Vanlalremdika made his professional debut for Aizawl in the I-League on 9 January 2016 against the reigning champions, Mohun Bagan. He played 80 minutes before coming off as Aizawl lost 3–1.

In 2021, he joined Kolkata-side Mohammedan Sporting. Under Nikola Stojanović's captaincy, Brandon and his team Mohammedan for the first time, ran for their maiden national league title in 2021–22 I-League season, but finished as runners-up after a 2–1 defeat to Gokulam Kerala at the end.

Career statistics

Club

Honours
Mohammedan Sporting
Calcutta Football League: 2021
I-League: 2021–22

References

External links 
 ZoFooty Profile

1994 births
Living people
Indian footballers
Aizawl FC players
East Bengal Club players
Association football forwards
Footballers from Mizoram
I-League 2nd Division players
I-League players